Ante Barac (born September 27, 1980) is a Croatian footballer who currently plays for NK Zagora Unešić in his home country. Barac is a midfielder from Split, Croatia.

Singapore
Scoring a free-kick in a 3–0 triumph over Balestier Khalsa in the S.League, Barac's goal was picked as the goal of the month for July 2012. He was also one of the midfielders in Goal.com's 2012 Round 7 S.League Team of the Week for his chance-creating and set-pieces to help his Housing beat Woodlands Wellington 3–1.

Authored one goal in the 2012 Singapore Cup, in a 2-1 quarterfinal win over Gombak United.

The midfielder's appearance bears some similitude to that of English footballer Bobby Charlton.

References

External links 
 at Soccerway

1980 births
Living people
Footballers from Split, Croatia
Association football midfielders
Croatian footballers
NK Pomorac 1921 players
NK Imotski players
NK Moslavina players
NK Dugopolje players
Hougang United FC players
NK Mosor players
First Football League (Croatia) players
Singapore Premier League players
Croatian expatriate footballers
Expatriate footballers in Singapore
Croatian expatriate sportspeople in Singapore